Ferdinand van Boisschot or Ferdinand de Boisschot (1560s or 26 June 1570 – 24 November 1649), Baron of Zaventem, was a jurist and diplomat from the Low Countries who became chancellor of the Duchy of Brabant.

Early life 
Van Boisschot was born in Brussels as the son of Jan Baptist van Boisschot and Catharina van den Troncke.  His father was a member of the Council of Brabant and was killed in the early stages of the Dutch Revolt during riots in Brussels in 1577/78. His family took refuge in Cologne, where Ferdinand commenced his studies. He studied law at the University of Cologne and at the University of Leuven and obtained the degree of doctor at law.  He then became a member of the magistrature.

Career 
In 1592, van Boisschot was appointed auditor general of the Army of Flanders, a post he held until 1611. From the beginning of 1611 until the end of 1615, he was the diplomatic representative in London of the Sovereign Archdukes Albert and Isabella. In 1615, Philip III of Spain made him a knight in the order of Santiago. He spent a further four years as resident ambassador of the Archdukes in Paris, and was appointed to the Privy Council and the Council of State in Brussels.

In 1621, van Boisschot was raised to the peerage, being awarded the lordship of Zaventem, and he went on to acquire Fontaine Castle and Groot-Bijgaarden Castle, and the lordships of Nossegem, Sterrebeek and Sint-Stevens-Woluwe. In 1644, he became count of Erps. He was appointed Chancellor of Brabant, the highest civilian function in the duchy of Brabant, in October 1625, succeeding Petrus Peckius the Younger.

Personal life 
Van Boisschot married Anna Maria de Camudio in 1607. His wife was a member of a prominent Basque family, who had come to Brussels as a lady-in-waiting to Archduchess Isabella. She was later made countess of Erps. The couple had one son, Frans van Boisschot, Count of Erps, who married Anne Marguerite, countess of Lannoy. He had two granddaughters, from whom the counts of Konigsegg-Rothenfels-Erps descend.

Van Boisschot died in Brussels on 24 November 1649 and was buried in the Church of Our Lady on the Zavel.

Art patron 
Van Boisschot commissioned Anthony van Dyck to paint a portrait of his wife, of which only copies survive.  Van Dyck is believed to have painted a pendant portrait of Ferdinand van Boisschot himself of which various copies exist.  A portrait of van Boisschot auctioned by Sotheby's on 10 July 2014 in London (lot 168) (formerly in the collection of the Earl of Warwick) is believed by some art historians to be the lost original of this painting.

Van Boisschot also acquired from van Dyck the painting Saint Martin Dividing his Cloak, presumably painted around 1618, which he donated to the Saint Martin's Church of Zaventem.

References

Bibliography

External links 
 

Lawyers of the Habsburg Netherlands
Jurists of the Spanish Netherlands
16th-century births
1649 deaths
Ambassadors of the Habsburg Netherlands
Chancellors of Brabant
People of the Eighty Years' War
Flemish nobility
History of Zaventem
Knights of Santiago
Diplomats of the Spanish Netherlands
University of Cologne alumni
Old University of Leuven alumni